Lachnocnema laches, the southern pied woolly legs, is a butterfly of the family Lycaenidae. It is found in coastal forests from the East Cape, along the coast of KwaZulu-Natal, inland to Eswatini, Mpumalanga, the Limpopo Province, and the North West Province along wooded hills and valleys. The habitat consists of savanna.

Adults are on wing year-round in warmer areas with peaks in spring and late summer.

References

Butterflies described in 1793
Miletinae